Statistics of Liberian Premier League for the 2009 season.

League standings

References
Liberia - List of final tables (RSSSF)

Football competitions in Liberia
Liberian Premier League, 2009